James Sean Wall (born October 11, 1964) is an American prelate of the Roman Catholic Church. He has been serving as bishop of the Diocese of Gallup in New Mexico since 2009.

Biography

Early life and education
Wall was born on the Navajo Nation in Ganado, Arizona, to James and Joan (née Hamilton) Wall. His parents converted to Catholicism after coming into contact with two Franciscan friars. One of six children, he has three sisters and two brothers. Wall graduated from Chandler High School in Chandler, Arizona, in 1983 and attended Arizona State University, obtaining a bachelor's degree in history in 1993.

He then entered St. John's Seminary in Camarillo, California, earning a Master of Divinity degree in 1998. He also studied at the Liturgical Institute of St. Mary of the Lake Seminary in Mundelein, Illinois.

Ordination and ministry
Wall was ordained to the priesthood for the Diocese of Phoenix by Bishop Thomas O'Brien on June 6, 1998. He then served as parochial vicar at St. Theresa Parish in Phoenix until 2001 and at St. Timothy Parish in Mesa, Arizona, from 2001 to 2002.

In 2002, Wall became pastor of St. Thomas the Apostle Parish in Phoenix. He remained at St. Thomas until his appointment to the diocesan chancery as vicar for priests in 2007. Wall also served as administrator pro tempore of Our Lady of Perpetual Help Parish in Scottsdale, Arizona, in 2007 and director of the Mount Claret Retreat Center in Phoenix from 2008 to 2009. From 2003 to 2007, Wall was a member of the National Advisory Council for the United States Conference of Catholic Bishops.

Bishop of Gallup
On February 5, 2009, Wall was appointed the fourth bishop of the Diocese of Gallup by Pope Benedict XVI. He was consecrated on April 2, 2009, by Archbishop Michael Sheehan.

In 2013, Wall renovated a chapel used by local seminarians with sacred art in santero, a New Mexico folk art based on Spanish colonial art. The artist, Arlene Sena, said that prayer was "the key to this tradition". The chapel contains images of the Holy Family, James, brother of Jesus, Francis de Sales, Our Lady of Mount Carmel, two angels, and the Sacred Heart.

See also

 Catholic Church hierarchy
 Catholic Church in the United States
 Historical list of the Catholic bishops of the United States
 List of the Catholic bishops of the United States
 Lists of patriarchs, archbishops, and bishops

References

External links

 Diocese of Gallup
 Sacred Heart Cathedral

Episcopal succession

1964 births
Living people
Arizona State University alumni
University of Saint Mary of the Lake alumni
People from Ganado, Arizona
Roman Catholic Diocese of Gallup
21st-century Roman Catholic bishops in the United States
Religious leaders from Arizona
Catholics from Arizona